
Gmina Szudziałowo is a rural gmina (administrative district) in Sokółka County, Podlaskie Voivodeship, in north-eastern Poland, on the border with Belarus.

The gmina contains part of the protected area called Knyszyń Forest Landscape Park.

Villages
Gmina Szudziałowo contains the villages and settlements of Aleksandrówka, Babiki, Biały Ług, Boratyńszczyzna, Brzozowy Hrud, Chmielowszczyzna, Chmielowszczyzna-Kolonia, Dziewiczy Ług, Grodzisko, Grzybowszczyzna, Hały-Ług, Harkawicze, Horczaki, Iwniki, Jeziorek, Klin, Klin-Gajówka, Knyszewicze, Knyszewicze Małe, Kozłowy Ług, Łaźnisko, Lipowy Most, Litwinowy Ług, Markowy Wygon, Minkowce, Miszkieniki Małe, Miszkieniki Wielkie, Nowe Trzciano, Nowinka, Nowy Ostrów, Ostrów Północny, Ostrówek, Pierekał, Pierożki, Pisarzowce, Poczopek, Rowek, Samogród, Słoja, Słójka, Słójka-Borowszczyzna, Sosnowik, Stare Trzciano, Suchy Hrud, Suchynicze, Sukowicze, Szczęsnowicze, Szudziałowo, Talkowszczyzna, Tołkacze, Usnarz Górny, Wierzchlesie, Wojnowce, Zubowszczyzna, Zubrzyca Mała and Zubrzyca Wielka.

Neighbouring gminas
Gmina Szudziałowo is bordered by the gminas of Gródek, Krynki, Sokółka and Supraśl. It also borders Belarus.

References
Polish official population figures 2006

Szudzialowo
Sokółka County